The 50th annual Berlin International Film Festival was held from February 9 to 20, 2000. The festival opened with The Million Dollar Hotel by Wim Wenders. Bossa Nova by Bruno Barreto, screened out of competition was the closing film of the festival. The Golden Bear was awarded to American  film Magnolia directed by Paul Thomas Anderson. The retrospective titled Artificial People and dedicated to artificial beings and machines in the films was shown at the festival, screening films like The Golem: How He Came into the World and The Terminator. On its 50th anniversary the premieres of the films in competition at the festival moved from Zoo Palast to Theater am Potsdamer Platz located at Potsdamer Platz.

Jury

The following people were announced as being on the jury for the festival:
 Gong Li, actress (China) - Jury President
 Lissy Bellaiche, member of the Det Danske Filminstitut (Denmark)
 Peter W. Jansen, scholar and journalist (Germany)
 Jean Pierre Lefebvre, director (Canada)
 Marisa Paredes, actress (Spain)
 Jean-Louis Piel, producer (France)
 Walter Salles, director, screenwriter and producer (Brazil)
 Maria Schrader, actress and director (Germany)
 Andrzej Wajda, director and screenwriter (Poland)

Films in competition
The following films were in competition for the Golden Bear and Silver Bear awards:

Key
{| class="wikitable" width="550" colspan="1"
| style="background:#FFDEAD;" align="center"| †
|Winner of the main award for best film in its section
|-
| colspan="2"| The opening and closing films are screened during the opening and closing ceremonies respectively.
|}

Awards

The following prizes were awarded by the Jury:
 Golden Bear: Magnolia by Paul Thomas Anderson
 Silver Bear – Special Jury Prize: The Road Home by Zhang Yimou
 Silver Bear for Best Director: Miloš Forman for Man on the Moon
 Silver Bear for Best Actress: Bibiana Beglau and Nadja Uhl for The Legend of Rita
 Silver Bear for Best Actor: Denzel Washington for The Hurricane
 Silver Bear for an outstanding artistic contribution: ensemble of actors for 
 Jury Prize: Wim Wenders for The Million Dollar Hotel
 Alfred Bauer Prize: Boy's Choir by Akira Ogata
 Blue Angel Award: The Legend of Rita by Volker Schlöndorff
 Honorary Golden Bear: Jeanne Moreau
 Berlinale Camera:
 Kon Ichikawa
 Wolfgang Jacobsen
FIPRESCI Award
Of Woman and Magic by Claude Miller

References

External links
Berlin International Film Festival:2000 at Internet Movie Database
 50th Berlin International Film Festival 2000

50
2000 film festivals
2000 festivals in Europe
2000 in Berlin
2000 in German cinema